Bhavan's Senior Secondary School is located in Kodunganoor, Trivandrum, Kerala, India. The school is affiliated to Central Board of Secondary Education.  It was established in 1986, under the guidance of the late Sri. Sooranad Kunjan Pillai and secretary Sri. M. Radhakrishnan Nair.

References

Private schools in Thiruvananthapuram
High schools and secondary schools in Thiruvananthapuram